Olbrich may refer to:

 André Olbrich, lead guitarist of the German power metal band Blind Guardian
 Erhard Olbrich (born 1941), German psychologist (de)
 Herbert Olbrich  Luftwaffe Generalleutnant 
 Johanna Olbrich (1926 - 2004), German female spy (DDR) (de)
 Joseph Maria Olbrich (1867 - 1908), an Austrian architect
 Jürgen O. Olbrich (born 1955), artist (de)
 Marina Olbrich (born 1969), Russian-born German chess player
 Olbrich Botanical Gardens, a botanical garden in Madison, Wisconsin, U.S.A.

See also 
 Olbricht

German-language surnames